V445 Puppis was a nova in the constellation Puppis. It was discovered by Kazuyoshi
Kanatsu of Matsue, Shimane, Japan, who recorded a peak magnitude of 8.6 on November 28, 2000. The nova was reported by Taichi Kato of Kyoto University in the International Astronomical Union circular 7552, issued on December 30, 2000. The location of this nova coincided with a magnitude 13.1 star that had been photographed in 1967. The proper motion of this star was measured as -4.7 mas/yr in right ascension and +6.4 mas/yr in declination, with a standard error of 4 mas/yr.

Examination of the optical spectrum of this nova showed absorption lines of calcium (Ca I), sodium (Na I) and singly ionized iron (Fe II). The initial spectrum was deficient in hydrogen and did not match those typical of other nova types. The infrared spectrum measured on January 31 showed a featureless continuum that decreased with increasing wavelength. This is consistent with emission from heated dust and suggests that the star is a recurrent nova that has generated dust during prior outbursts. By 2004, the object had faded and the dust emission had disappeared.

The deficient level of hydrogen in this outburst, along with an enrichment of helium and carbon, and a higher level of ionization, suggested that it was the first observed instance of a helium nova. This is theorized to occur when a white dwarf star predominantly accretes helium (rather than hydrogen) from an orbiting companion. When sufficient helium has accumulated along a shell on the surface of the white dwarf, a run-away thermonuclear explosion results in a nova outburst. Hence, V445 Puppis may belong to a binary star system and be surrounded by an accretion disk of matter drawn from the companion star.

At present, the system is being obscured by an optically thick cloud of dust.

The white dwarf in the V445 Puppis system has an estimated mass of more than 1.3 times the mass of the Sun, and this mass is increasing because of recurring helium shell flashes from accreted material. As the mass of the white dwarf approaches the Chandrasekhar limit of about 1.38 solar masses, it will likely explode as a Type Ia supernova.

References

Puppis
Novae
Puppis, V445